Colin Moore is a Guyanese Olympic boxer. He represented his country in the light-flyweight division at the 1988 Summer Olympics. He lost his first bout against Róbert Isaszegi of Hungary. Moore also represented Guyana at the 1987 Pan American Games, losing his first fight to Michael Carbajal of the United States.

References

1962 births
Living people
Guyanese male boxers
Olympic boxers of Guyana
Boxers at the 1988 Summer Olympics
Pan American Games competitors for Guyana
Boxers at the 1987 Pan American Games
Light-flyweight boxers